The Robert H. Goddard House, located at 1501 East Mescalero Road near Roswell, New Mexico, was built in 1908.  Also known as Mescalero Ranch, it is a Pueblo Revival building.  It was listed on the National Register of Historic Places in 1988.

It was a home of rocket scientist Robert H. Goddard during 1930 to 1932 and from 1934 to 1942, a highly productive time for Goddard's experiments in rocketry.

It is a one-story adobe flat-roofed building covered with stucco.

References

Houses on the National Register of Historic Places in New Mexico
Traditional Native American dwellings
Houses completed in 1930
Chaves County, New Mexico
Pueblo Revival architecture in New Mexico